Acanthopleurus is an extinct genus of prehistoric bony fish that lived during the early Oligocene epoch.

See also

 Prehistoric fish
 List of prehistoric bony fish

References

Oligocene fish
Paleogene fish of Europe
Fossil taxa described in 1843